The 2015 Red Bull Ring GP2 Series round was a GP2 Series motor race held on 20 and 21 June 2015 at the Red Bull Ring in Austria. It was the fourth round of the 2015 GP2 Series. The race weekend supported the 2015 Austrian Grand Prix.

Classification

Qualifying

Feature Race

Sprint Race

See also 
 2015 Austrian Grand Prix
 2015 Red Bull Ring GP3 Series round

References

External links 
 Official website of GP2 Series

GP2
Red Bull Ring